Lewis Township is an inactive township in Holt County, in the U.S. state of Missouri.

Lewis Township was erected in the 1840s, most likely taking its name from John Lewis, a local law enforcement agent.

References

Townships in Missouri
Townships in Holt County, Missouri